This is a list of seasons of the Central Hockey League since its inception.

References

External links
Historic standings and statistics - at Internet Hockey Database

    
Central Hockey League seasons